Pascal Brindeau (born 20 June 1974) is a French politician. He is Member of Parliament for Loir-et-Cher's 3rd constituency since 2019, after serving a previous term for the same seat between 2010 and 2012.

He lost his seat in the first round of the 2022 French legislative election.

References 

Living people
1974 births
21st-century French politicians

The Centrists politicians
Deputies of the 13th National Assembly of the French Fifth Republic
Deputies of the 15th National Assembly of the French Fifth Republic